WERH-FM (92.1 FM, "Country 92.1") was a radio station broadcasting a country music format. Formerly licensed to Hamilton, Alabama, United States, the station was licensed to Kate F. Fite.

Although Kate F. Fite was still listed as the station's licensee in the FCC database, she died on June 15, 2001, and the station's December 2003 license renewal application listed the licensee as "Kate F. Fite (deceased), Martha H. Fowler, & Megan Summerford."

The station was assigned the WERH-FM call letters by the Federal Communications Commission on December 8, 1978.

On Monday, May 1, 2017, at 10:35 a.m., WERH-FM played its last song; "Abba Dabba Honeymoon", which is the first song the station played when it went on the air in 1950. The FCC cancelled the station's license on March 12, 2019, due to the station having been silent since signing off in 2017.

References

External links

ERH-FM
Marion County, Alabama
Radio stations established in 1950
1950 establishments in Alabama
Defunct radio stations in the United States
Radio stations disestablished in 2019
2019 disestablishments in Alabama
ERH-FM